Gennadiy Mikhailovich Michurin (1897–1970) was a Soviet stage and film actor.

Biography
Michurin was born      1897. In 1917-1918 he studied at the Petrograd School of theatrical skill. In 1918 he became an actor of the Bolshoi Drama Theater. 

In the movie starred in 1923, made his debut in the role of Dmitry Karakozov.

Selected filmography
 The Palace and the Fortress (1924)
 The Decembrists (1927)
 The Poet and the Tsar (1927)
 My Son (1928)
 Kastus Kalinovskiy (1928)
 Golden Beak (1928)
 Cities and Years (1930)
 An Ardent Heart (1953)

References

Bibliography 
 Lilya Kaganovsky / Masha Salazkina. Sound, Speech, Music in Soviet and Post-Soviet Cinema. Indiana University Press, 2014.

External links 
 

1897 births
1970 deaths
Soviet male film actors
Russian male film actors
Russian male silent film actors
Soviet male stage actors
Russian male stage actors
Burials at Serafimovskoe Cemetery
Honored Artists of the RSFSR
Stalin Prize winners